

The Big Bend is part of the Trans-Pecos region in southwestern Texas, United States along the border with Mexico, north of the prominent bend in the Rio Grande for which the region is named. Here the Rio Grande passes between the Chisos Mountains in Texas and the Sierra Madre Oriental in Mexico as it changes from running east-southeast to north-northeast. The region covers three counties: Presidio County to the west, Brewster County to the east, and Jeff Davis County to the north.

The region is rugged, sparsely populated Chihuahua Desert, including the Chisos Mountains, Chinati Mountains, and the Davis Mountains. It is also the home of the McDonald Observatory. In Mexico, adjacent areas of protected lands on the south side of the Rio Grande include the Cañón de Santa Elena Flora and Fauna Protection Area (ca. 511,508 acres), Ocampo Flora and Fauna Protection Area (ca. 850,630 acres), and the Maderas del Carmen Flora and Fauna Protection Area (ca. 514,920 acres). 

The largest towns in the region are Alpine, Presidio, Marfa, Sanderson, Terlingua, and Marathon. The counties are Presidio County, Jeff Davis County, Brewster County, Pecos County, and Terrell County.

See also
List of geographical regions in Texas
Balmorhea State Park
Trans-Pecos

References

Further reading

External links

The Big Bend of Texas., 1920, hosted by the Portal to Texas History
 West Texas Weekly- a local weekly newspaper.
 Visit Big Bend- an extensive website on the Big Bend region and attractions.

Regions of Texas
Big Bend National Park
World War II Heritage Cities